Alocasia brisbanensis, commonly known as cunjevoi or spoon lily, is a species of plant in the family Araceae native to rainforests of eastern Australia. The common name "cunjevoi" derives from the Bundjalung language of northern New South Wales.

Description
The perfumed, summer flowers are greenish-cream in colour, and similar to an arum lily. Red fruits follow the flowering.

The plant is poisonous, and contact with the sap can lead to skin and eye irritation due to the presence of needle-like crystals of Calcium oxalate. Eating any part of the plant causes immediate pain, a burning sensation and swelling of the lips, tongue and mouth. A small number of children have died as a result of eating parts of the plant.

References

See also
 List of plants known as lily

External links
 
 
 View a map of historical sightings of this species at the Australasian Virtual Herbarium
 View observations of this species on iNaturalist
 View images of this species on Flickriver

Notes

brisbanensis
Flora of New South Wales
Flora of Queensland
Monocots of Australia
Plants described in 1902